Four Riders, a.k.a. Hellfighters of the East, is a 1972 Hong Kong film directed by Chang Cheh. It stars David Chiang, Ti Lung Chen Kuan-Tai, Wang Chung and Yasuaki Kurata.

Four Riders was produced by Shaw Studios and distributed in the U.S. as a dubbed version titled Strike 4 Revenge by World Northal Corp. in 1983.

References

External links

1972 films
Hong Kong action films
1972 action films
1970s Mandarin-language films
Films directed by Chang Cheh
Shaw Brothers Studio films
1970s Hong Kong films